James Lewis (born in 1961) joined 4-R Restaurant Group (announced April 2019), which operates fourteen 4 Rivers Smokehouses in Florida and Georgia, as president of its 4-R Signature Products and 4-R Foods Divisions.

Early career
Jim Lewis was born in Hammond, Indiana.  He graduated from Indiana State University with a BS in Accounting in 1984.  He became a Certified Public Accountant.  He later earned his MBA from the Krannert School of Management at Purdue University in 1992.

In August 1984, Lewis began his first job as an accountant with PricewaterhouseCoopers where he quickly developed a reputation as a top-notch and versatile professional, and was rewarded with prestigious assignments in audit, tax, and consulting. While at PWC, Lewis passed the examination to become a Certified Public Accountant. After a short period, PricewaterhouseCoopers promoted James Lewis to Senior Accountant.

In September 1986, Lewis accepted a job as Manager of Internal Audit for Tokheim Corporation, a multinational company that manufactures fluid movement and measuring devices in Fort Wayne, Indiana. At Tokheim, Lewis directed all financial and operational audits; assisted senior management in the evaluation of acquisition candidates, participated in strategic planning sessions and made numerous recommendations to management; which reduced operating costs, improved operating efficiency, and reduced outside audit fees.

In November 1988, Lewis became employed by PepsiCo in Indianapolis, Indiana, where he quickly advanced to the position of Senior Manager, Planning and Analysis. In April 1993, PepsiCo promoted Lewis to Director, Investor Relations. During his tenure as Director, the Consumer Analyst Group of New York ranked PepsiCo’s Investor Relations function number one in America.

In December 1994, PepsiCo promoted Lewis to Area Vice President of the New York, New York regions. In his capacity as Area Vice President, Lewis developed regional snack food businesses for Frito-Lay as general manager and turnaround specialist. He was responsible for the sales, marketing, distribution, finance, and warehouse functions of the Company. He directed an organization of one hundred fifty-five (155) people, including fifteen (15) direct reports. Under his leadership, the businesses experienced a 13% sales increase and a 15% profit increase. The New York region went from last place (out of 22 areas) to first place during his first year as one of the general managers. His team received the company’s Herman Lay Award for having the highest region score on combined revenue growth, profit growth, and product display execution. In late 1995 Lewis, who was demoted from Vice President, was assigned to the Houston North Zone Region as a Zone Sales Manager. He supervised 13 District Managers and over 100 route sales representatives. Due to problems created by Lewis within the first six months of his tenure, he was moved to the Frito-Lay main office in Houston until he resigned in 1996.

Career with the Walt Disney Company
Lewis began his Disney Career in 1996 as the Director of Planning and Finance for Walt Disney Attractions. He progressed to become Senior Vice President, Business Development and Public Affairs for the Walt Disney World Resort. Jim became the General Manager of the Disney Vacation Club (DVC) in November 2003; he was promoted to the position of President in 2006, making him one of the most senior African-Americans in the Disney Company. He received the Company's highest performance rating for 14 consecutive years.

During his tenure as President of the Disney Vacation Club, Lewis' division has expanded rapidly.  When he took over, DVC had approximately 70,000 members in 2003; there were over 300,000 in 2006. The LA Times reported that the Disney Vacation Club's sales and profits more than doubled from 2003 to 2007.  Lewis has overseen the expansion of his division to California with the addition of time-share rooms at Disney's Grand Californian Hotel & Spa and to Hawaii with the forthcoming Aulani Resort.  Lewis led DVC’s first international expansion with the development of a 15,000 square foot sales center in Tokyo, Japan. Six of DVC's 12 resorts were designed and built during Lewis' tenure.

Jim Lewis abruptly "parted-ways" with Disney in 2011. Disney ousted Lewis for his part in selling time-shares for over a year, at the Aulani resort in Hawaii, with fees that were less than the cost of actual taxes and maintenance.

After Disney
Lewis was hired as a corporate officer at Wal-Mart in 2013 and left in 2015. Also in September 2015, he was named Chief Executive Officer of the national, Florida-based company Marilyn Monroe Spas Board.

Activities outside Disney
In 2007, Lewis was named one of the ten most influential businessmen in Central Florida by the Orlando Business Journal. In 2008, The Steve Harvey Morning Show aired a piece on Lewis, honoring him as an "Influential African American" in the area of business.  In April 2009, Lewis was elected Chairman of the American Resort Development Association.  He also serves on the board of directors of his church.

Personal life
Jim is married and has two children.

References

1953 births
Living people
Walt Disney Parks and Resorts people
Disney executives
Indiana State University alumni
People from Hammond, Indiana
Krannert School of Management alumni